Sir Robert Bruce, 3rd Baron of Clackmannan & Rate (died c. 1405) was the son of Sir Robert Bruce, 2nd Baron of Clackmannan & Rate and Isabel Stewart of Fife.

Robert Bruce was born into the Scottish aristocracy in Clackmannan, Scotland. He married the daughter of John Scrimgeour of Dudhope, by whom he had at least three children:
 David Bruce, who succeeded his father as 4th Baron of Clackmannan;
 Edward Bruce, who married Agnes, the daughter and co-heiress of Sir William Airth of Airth;
 James Bruce, later Bishop of Dunkeld.

Sources 

Robert Bruce, 3rd Baron of Clackmannan
Robert Bruce, 3rd Baron of Clackmannan
Robert Bruce, 3rd Baron of Clackmannan
Year of birth missing
1436 deaths
Scottish feudal barons